Crinozoa is a subphylum of mostly sessile echinoderms, of which the crinoids, or sea lilies, are the only extant members. Crinozoans have an extremely extensive fossil history, which may or may not extend into the Precambrian (provided the enigmatic Ediacaran Arkarua can be positively identified as an edrioasteroid).

Classes within Crinozoa
The classes currently contained within Crinozoa include Crinoidea, Cystoidea, Edrioasteroidea, and Rhombifera.

See also
 List of echinoderm orders
 Blastoids, superficially similar-appearing echinoderms that belong to a different echinoderm subphylum.

References

 
Animal subphyla
Paleozoic invertebrates
Extant Cambrian first appearances